The 1st–11th Cuirassier Regiment  was an armoured (tank) regiment of the French Army. It was the armoured component of the 3rd Mechanised Brigade from 1 July 1999.

History
The Chief of Staff of the French Army decided on 1 September 1990 to create a new experimental armoured regiment of 80 tanks with two squadron groups (Groupes d'Escadrons, GE). Each group would consist of three combat squadrons and one command and logistics squadron.

The 1er-11e RC was formed on 5 June 1999 by merging the 1st Cuirassier Regiment and the 11th Cuirassier Regiment. It was disbanded 29 July 2009.

Organization

The regiment was composed of around 1350 personnel organized into 13 Squadrons.

1st Cuirassier Groupe d'Escadron (1er CGE) – 1st Cuirassier Squadron Group (x40 MBTs)
ECL –  Command and Logistics Squadron
1e Esq  – 1st Squadron
2e Esq  – 2nd Squadron
3e Esq  – 3rd Squadron
11e Cuirassier Groupe d'Escadron (11e CGE) – 11th Cuirassier Squadron Group (x40 MBTs)
ECL –  Command and Logistics Squadron
1e Esq  – 1st Squadron
2e Esq  – 2nd Squadron
3e Esq  – 3rd Squadron
EBI – Base and Instructions Squadron
EMR – Regimental Maintenance Squadron
ESGM – Garrison Support & Maintenance Squadron
EEI –  Reconnaissance Squadron
5e Esq  – 5th Squadron (Reserve)

Commanding officers
List of Commanding Officers since 1999.

1st–11th Cuirassier Regiment
Colonel Dumont Saint Priest, July 1999
Colonel de Courreges d'Ustou, July 2001
Colonel Hautecloque Raysz, July 2003
Colonel Pillet, July 2005

1st Cuirassier Squadrons Group
Lieutenant Colonel Guillemet, July 1999
Lieutenant Colonel Darnaudat, July 2001
Lieutenant Colonel Beaussant, July 2003
Lieutenant Colonel Fremin du Sartel, July 2005

11th Cuirassier Squadrons Group
Lieutenant Colonel Galy-Dejean, July 1999
Lieutenant Colonel Tavernier, July 2001
Lieutenant Colonel Isabellon, July 2003
Lieutenant Colonel Philipeau, July 2005

Notes

References
Amicale des Anciens et Amis du 1er Régiment de Cuirassiers

Cuirassier Regiment, 1st–11th
Cuirassier Regiment, 1st–11th
Military units and formations established in 1999
1999 establishments in France
Military units and formations disestablished in 2009